Rosetta Loy (15 May 1931 – 1 October 2022) was an Italian writer. She was the recipient of the Rapallo Carige Prize for Le strade di polvere (The Dusty Roads) in 1988.

Born Rosetta Provera, she was the youngest of four children of a  Piedmontese father and a mother from Rome. She wrote her first story at the age of nine, but her real literary vocation manifested itself towards the age of twenty-five. However, she had to wait until 1974 for her first publication, The Bicycle.

Personal life and death
She was married for thirty years to Beppe Loy, with whom she had four children. 

She died of a heart attack at her home in Rome, aged 91. She was buried in the cemetery of Mirabello Monferrato, the Piedmontese town where The Dusty Roads was set and where her father's house is still located.

References

1931 births
2022 deaths
Italian women novelists
20th-century Italian women writers
20th-century Italian novelists
21st-century Italian women writers
21st-century Italian novelists
Writers from Rome